Demon's Crest, known in Japan as Demon's Blazon, is a side-scrolling platform video game developed and published by Capcom for the Super Nintendo Entertainment System. It is the third video game starring Firebrand (an enemy character from the Ghosts 'n Goblins series, known as "Red Arremer" in the Japanese version), following Gargoyle's Quest and Gargoyle's Quest II.

Plot

The game's story revolves around the Crests, six magical stones which preside over their respective elements (Fire, Earth, Water, Air, Time and Heaven). When all crests are combined, the Crest of Infinity will appear, allowing its holder infinite power and the ability to conquer all realms with it. The demons of the Demon Realm have long fought each other for possession of the Crests, five of which have since fallen into the hands of a red demon named Firebrand. Seeking infinite power, Firebrand challenges a Demon Dragon for the Crest of Heaven and is victorious, though badly wounded. In his weakness, a rival demon named Phalanx ambushes Firebrand and takes all the Crests except the Fire Crest which shattered into five shards.

As the game begins, Phalanx has already begun using the Crests to become the ruler of the Demon Realm, while Firebrand is imprisoned in an amphitheater and made to fight the zombified Demon Dragon. After escaping the amphitheater, Firebrand sets out to regain the Crests and get revenge on Phalanx. Along the way, Firebrand is repeatedly challenged by Phalanx's general, Arma, who grudgingly returns each of the Crests to Firebrand out of respect for his power.

Finally, Firebrand challenges Phalanx in his castle within the Demon Realm. Depending on the player's choices, three different endings are possible in this battle. The worst ending has Firebrand killing Phalanx and leaving the Demon Realm as it falls into complete anarchy, while a more favorable ending has Phalanx sealing himself inside the Crest of Heaven and Firebrand hiding all the Crests. The third ending concludes with Firebrand slaying Phalanx after he summons the Crest of Infinity to transform into a hideous beast, then tossing the Crests off a cliff after deciding that he does not seek conquest.

Completing the game with the third ending gives the player a special password that allows Firebrand to continue the game with a new transformation, the Ultimate Gargoyle, and access the hidden fourth ending in which Firebrand can challenge a secret boss named Dark Demon. Upon winning this battle the fourth ending plays, in which Firebrand casts away the Crests out of pride for his own power, then leaves to seek another worthy opponent to fight.

Gameplay

The gameplay is a mix of standard platforming, with mild RPG elements. The stages are divided into six main areas and can be played multiple times. The game also has metroidvania elements, where the player has to revisit a level with new Crests to access areas, items, and bosses that could not be accessed before. There is also a world map players use to navigate.

Firebrand's main abilities are his fire breath, claws for clinging onto walls, and wings to hover in the air (though he cannot gain height early in the game). As he collects Crests, Firebrand can transform and gain new powers that are specialized for combat and exploration: Ground Gargoyle, Aerial Gargoyle, Tidal Gargoyle, Legendary Gargoyle, and Ultimate Gargoyle. Other items to collect include extra hit points, flasks and spell vellums for using consumable magic items, and talismans that can improve Firebrand's abilities.

Release
Demon's Crest was released in Japan on October 21, 1994. It was followed by a release in North America in November 1994.

In 2014, Demon's Crest was re-released on Nintendo's Virtual Console. In 2016, it was released for the 3DS Virtual Console. It is available for the Nintendo Switch with the console's online subscription service.

Reception

GamePro praised the macabre graphics and complexity of the gameplay, particularly the use of the acquired abilities, but criticized the repetitive music and lack of variety in enemy attacks. They summarized that "Demon's Crest brings depth and artistry to the action/adventure genre, making it one of the season's top SNES games". Electronic Gaming Monthly scored it 33 out of 40, with their four reviewers applauding the game's beautiful graphics and complex gameplay. Japanese video game magazine Famitsu gave it a score of 28 out of 40. Next Generation gave it a score of 3 out of 5, noting that the game is very short, and that most secret items are not needed to complete the game.

Joypad gave it a 79% score.

Nintendo Power praised the game, noting "excellent graphics, play control and game balance and sound". 

In 2018, Complex listed Demon's Crest 59th on their "The Best Super Nintendo Games of All Time". They commented that Demon's Crest is like Castlevania, but with the abilities to fly and shoot fireballs, and they felt the game was "awesome". In 1995, Total! ranked the game 57th on their Top 100 SNES Games writing: "Almost an RPG but this platformer has more action then you can wave a demonic entity at." IGN rated Demon's Crest 44th in its Top 100 SNES Games.

Notes

References

External links

1994 video games
Dark fantasy video games
Gargoyles in popular culture
Ghosts 'n Goblins
Gothic video games
Metroidvania games
Super Nintendo Entertainment System games
Video game spin-offs
Video games about demons
Video games developed in Japan
Video games with alternate endings
Virtual Console games
Virtual Console games for Wii U
Virtual Console games for Nintendo 3DS
Nintendo Switch Online games
Single-player video games